The 1984 United States presidential election in Louisiana took place on November 6, 1984. All 50 states and the District of Columbia, were part of the 1984 United States presidential election. State voters chose ten electors to the Electoral College, which selected the president and vice president of the United States. Louisiana was won by incumbent United States President Ronald Reagan of California, who was running against former Vice President Walter Mondale of Minnesota. Reagan ran for a second time with former C.I.A. Director George H. W. Bush of Texas, and Mondale ran with Representative Geraldine Ferraro of New York, the first major female candidate for the vice presidency.

The presidential election of 1984 was a very partisan election for Louisiana, with just under 99 percent of the electorate voting only for either the Democratic or Republican parties, though eight parties appeared on the ballot. All but two parishes gave either Mondale or Reagan a majority; East Feliciana gave Reagan a narrow plurality, and Madison Parish gave Mondale a narrow plurality. Of Louisiana's 64 parishes, a vast majority (53) gave Reagan a majority; nine gave Mondale a majority. Mondale's best showing was in Orleans Parish, the state's largest parish, where he got 57.9% of the vote; Reagan's was in thinly-populated LaSalle Parish, where he got 78.8% of the vote. However, Reagan exceeded 70% in eight parishes (including the highly populated New Orleans suburb of Jefferson Parish and the moderately populated New Orleans suburb of St Tammany Parish). This was the first election since 1944 in which Louisiana supported the same party as it did in the previous election.

Louisiana weighed in for this election as 2% more Republican than the national average. , this is the last election in which St. John the Baptist Parish voted for a Republican presidential candidate.

Reagan carried Louisiana by a landslide margin in excess of 22 points, a substantial improvement with respect to 1980, when he carried it over Southerner Jimmy Carter by just 5.45%. He became only the second Republican to break 60% in the Pelican State (after Nixon in 1972)--and remains, as of 2020, the last nominee of either party to do so. Mondale's strength was largely limited to Louisiana's largely African-American Black Belt parishes along the Mississippi River, along with Orleans Parish (coterminous with the city of New Orleans) and one parish in then-typically Democratic 'Imperial Calcasieu', Allen Parish. In none of these parishes did Mondale manage over 60% of the vote. 

Reagan dominated the rest of the state, claiming a series of parishes near the border with Texas and in Acadiana that Carter had been able to hold in his competitive loss in the state in 1980. He also performed superlatively in New Orleans' two main suburban parishes, Jefferson and St Tammany; in both, he exceeded Richard Nixon's 1972 vote share, earning the highest vote share of any nominee in both parishes since the last time the Democratic Party had swept the South, in the 1944 election. In 1988, Michael Dukakis would reclaim many Acadiana parishes, cutting the margin to 10.2%--still more Republican than the country, but rather less Republican than much of the rest of the South, and setting the stage for Bill Clinton's two solid wins in the state before it followed a trajectory in the 21st century of becoming a solidly Republican state.

Democratic platform
Walter Mondale accepted the Democratic nomination for presidency after pulling narrowly ahead of Senator Gary Hart of Colorado and Rev. Jesse Jackson of Illinois - his main contenders during what would be a very contentious Democratic primary. During the campaign, Mondale was vocal about reduction of government spending, and, in particular, was vocal against heightened military spending on the nuclear arms race against the Soviet Union, which was reaching its peak on both sides in the early 1980s.

Taking a (what was becoming the traditional liberal) stance on the social issues of the day, Mondale advocated for gun control, the right to choose regarding abortion, and strongly opposed the repeal of laws regarding institutionalized prayer in public schools. He also criticized Reagan for his economic marginalization of the poor, stating that Reagan's reelection campaign was "a happy talk campaign," not focused on the real issues at hand.

A very significant political move during this election: the Democratic Party nominated Representative Geraldine Ferraro to run with Mondale as Vice-President. Ferraro is the first female candidate to receive such a nomination in United States history. She said in an interview at the 1984 Democratic National Convention that this action "opened a door which will never be closed again," speaking to the role of women in politics.

Republican platform

By 1984, Reagan was very popular with voters across the nation as the President who saw them out of the economic stagflation of the early and middle 1970s, and into a period of (relative) economic stability.

The economic success seen under Reagan was politically accomplished (principally) in two ways. The first was initiation of deep tax cuts for the wealthy, and the second was a wide-spectrum of tax cuts for crude oil production and refinement, namely, with the 1980 Windfall profits tax cuts. These policies were augmented with a call for heightened military spending, the cutting of social welfare programs for the poor, and the increasing of taxes on those making less than $50,000 per year. Collectively called "Reaganomics", these economic policies were established through several pieces of legislation passed between 1980 and 1987.

These new tax policies also arguably curbed several existing tax loopholes, preferences, and exceptions, but Reaganomics is typically remembered for its trickle down effect of taxing poor Americans more than rich ones. Reaganomics has (along with legislation passed under presidents George H. W. Bush and Bill Clinton) been criticized by many analysts as "setting the stage" for economic troubles in the United States after 2007, such as the Great Recession.

Virtually unopposed during the Republican primaries, Reagan ran on a campaign of furthering his economic policies. Reagan vowed to continue his "war on drugs," passing sweeping legislation after the 1984 election in support of mandatory minimum sentences for drug possession.  Furthermore, taking a (what was becoming the traditional conservative) stance on the social issues of the day, Reagan strongly opposed legislation regarding comprehension of gay marriage, abortion, and (to a lesser extent) environmentalism, regarding the final as simply being bad for business.

Results

Results by parish

See also
 United States presidential elections in Louisiana
 Presidency of Ronald Reagan

Notes

References

Louisiana
1984
1984 Louisiana elections